is a Japanese footballer who plays as a midfielder for HNK Sibenik on loan from FC TIAMO Hirakata.

Club career
Arai made his professional debut for Cerezo Osaka in an Emperor's Cup win against Albirex Niigata on 4 August 2021. Five days later, he made his J1 League debut, playing 45 minutes against Vegalta Sendai. From there to the end of the season, he was selected to play just another two matches for Cerezo, which were at the J.League Cup. His debut at the 2022 season for Cerezo came in the same competition, where he got an assist against Gamba Osaka, in the team's second match of the season. He played more two matches in March, being it the last month where he earned game time with Cerezo. Despite not playing too many minutes of football across the two seasons, it caught the attention of the 1.HNL club HNK Sibenik. He then left Cerezo to sign for the croatian club on a loan transfer until 1 July 2023, being loaned by FC TIAMO Hirakata, from the Japan Football League, the 4th division in their league system.

Career statistics

Club

References

External links

1998 births
Living people
Association football people from Saitama Prefecture
Japanese footballers
Association football defenders
Japan Football League players
FC Tiamo Hirakata players
Cerezo Osaka players
HNK Šibenik players